Cheer Squad is a Canadian reality television series that debuted on ABC Spark on July 6, 2016, and in the US on Freeform on August 22, 2016. It follows the Canadian cheer team the Great White Sharks as they work together on the road to world championships. As of 2018 there is only one season, and there will not be a second season.

Cast
 Ashleigh Dodunski (25)
 Jenna Dodunski (25)
 Jordan Knox (Knoxy) (26)
 Daniela Uhlenbruck (Dani) (22)
 Laura Ashley  (L.A.) (24)
 Sarah Schlotzhauer (Schlotzy)(19)
 Brittany Silveira (B-Silv) (19)
 Alicia Jantzi (Yahtzee) (21)
 Leah Smith (Smitty) (17)
 Erin Kotlar (Moe) (23)
 Emily Vesterfelt (Vesty) (16)
 Bethany Lewis (Beth) (26
 Rebecca Webster (Becca) (26
 Chelsea Matteson (15)
 Christina Zara (Zara) (16)
 Lindsay MacKenzie (Mack) (19)
 Lora Jordan (asst Coach)
 Mariah Vittoria Pimpao (Bella) (14)
 Jennifer Power (Power)(24)
 Lindsay Everson (Nubs) (16)
 Ashley Blayney-Hoffer (B.H.) (17)
 Kiana Horchover (Horch) (19)
 Haley Debruyne (Bruney) (18)
 Ali Moffatt  (Coach)
 Anna (17)
 Ashley (Preddy) (20)

Episodes

References

External links
 
 Cheer Squad on Facebook

2010s Canadian reality television series
2016 Canadian television series debuts
2016 Canadian television series endings
Television series by Corus Entertainment
English-language television shows
Cheerleading television series
Television series about teenagers